Castle Stewart may refer to:

Castle Stewart (Washington, D.C.), a mansion
Earl Castle Stewart, a title in the Peerage of Ireland

See also
Castle Stuart, a tower house in Scotland
Stewart Castle, a castle in Northern Ireland